Panmure Island Provincial Park is a provincial park in Prince Edward Island, Canada. It is located along a causeway connecting Prince Edward Island with Panmure Island. The Native Council of Prince Edward Island hosts their annual Abegweit Pow Wow in the park.

References

Provincial parks of Prince Edward Island
Parks in Kings County, Prince Edward Island